Cargo Music Inc. is an American punk rock record label based in San Diego, California. It distributes records for other labels,  such as Cherry Red Records, Earth Music, FistPuppet Records, Grilled Cheese, Headhunter Records, Re-Constriction Records, RPM Records and Tackle Box. Notable artists that have been signed to Cargo Music include Blink-182, Young Dubliners, Rocket from the Crypt, Drive Like Jehu, and 7 Seconds.

The company was first established in 1989 as a division of the Canadian record company Cargo Records. When its founders sold the Canadian parent company to new owners in 1995, the American division was not part of the sale. It became a separate company which continued to be owned and operated by founder Eric Goodis. His former business partner Phillip Hill took over ownership and operation of the former parent company's office in the United Kingdom to form Cargo Records (UK). The American and British companies were not affected by the Canadian company's bankruptcy in 1997, and both remained in operation as of 2011.

The company maintained a distribution office in Chicago which was closed in 1998.

Commercial success
Cargo Music has received three platinum records (United States, Canada and Australia), of Blink-182's second album Dude Ranch.

Artists
Current artists
 Comeback Kid

Former artists
 Rocket from the Crypt
 Drive Like Jehu
 7 Seconds
 Blink-182
 Creedle
 Three Mile Pilot
 Heavy Vegetable
 Pitchblende
 Olivelawn
 Deadbolt
 Chune
 Inch
 Fluf

References

American record labels
Record labels established in 1989